Jamison County is one of the 141 Cadastral divisions of New South Wales. It is located to the north of the Namoi River, near Wee Waa.

Jamison County was named in honour of landowner and constitutional reformer Sir John Jamison (1776-1844).

Parishes within this county
A full list of parishes found within this county; their current LGA and mapping coordinates to the approximate centre of each location is as follows:

References

Counties of New South Wales